

Dan Leno (20 December 1860 – 31 October 1904) was an English comedian and stage actor of the Victorian and Edwardian eras, famous for performing in music hall.  As a child, he was known for his clog dancing, and in his teen years, he became the star of his family's music hall act throughout Britain. He was an increasingly popular solo artist during the late 1880s and 1890s.  He also performed in pantomimes and a few Victorian burlesques and comic plays and musicals, especially in the last two decades of his career.

Leno's first theatre appearance (as distinguished from music hall) was in pantomime in Liverpool in 1865, where he had a supporting part as a juvenile clown in Fortunatus; or, The Magic Wishing Cap alongside his parents, who appeared as "Mr and Mrs Leno – Comic Duettists".  Leno earned wider theatrical notice as Dame Durden in a pantomime Jack and the Beanstalk at London's Surrey Theatre in 1886, having been spotted singing "Going to Buy Milk" by the theatre's manager.  The piece was a success, and Leno received rave reviews; as a result, he was booked to star as Tinpanz the Tinker in the following year's pantomime, Sinbad and the Little Old Man of the Sea; or, The Tinker, the Tailor, the Soldier, the Sailor, Apothecary, Ploughboy, Gentleman Thief.  The Era reported that Leno "made a capital Tinker, full of drollery and grotesque business."

Sinbad brought Leno to the attention of Augustus Harris, the manager of the Theatre Royal, Drury Lane, one of the largest London theatres, which staged elaborate pantomime spectacles every Christmas.  Harris offered Leno a role in the theatre's 1888 Christmas pantomime, Babes in the Wood. One critic wrote that "'the cake' for frolicsome humour is taken by the dapper new-comer, Mr. Dan Leno, who is sketched as the galvanic baroness in the wonderfully amusing dance which sets the house in a roar. The substantial "babes", Mr. Herbert Campbell and Mr. Harry Nicholls, would have no excuse if they did not vie in drollery with the light footed Dan Leno." Babes was a triumph: the theatre reported record attendance, and the run was extended until 27 April 1889. Leno went on to star in a total of 16 Christmas pantomimes at Drury Lane from 1888 to 1904. In 15 of these, he played alongside Herbert Campbell, a veteran pantomime performer, with Leno playing predominantly dame roles. Leno became famous for his characterisations of dame roles, and he was described as the "precursor of contemporary pantomime dames".

Leno also performed in a few other theatre productions during his career, including burlesques and musical comedies, while continuing to perform in his own popular music hall act, in London and on tour in the British provinces.  By 1902, he had become an alcoholic and had begun to decline physically and mentally; he was briefly admitted to a mental asylum in 1903 and, upon his release later that year, played in only one more production. Leno died the following year, aged 43.

Productions

Note: The source for Leno's stage performances, except as otherwise noted, is Barry Anthony, The Kings Jester, pp. 215–16.

See also
 Songs, sketches and monologues of Dan Leno

References

Sources

External links 
 
 Dan Leno profile and recordings of "The Huntsman" (1901) and "Going To The Races" (1903)
 The legacy of Dan Leno at Ward's Book of Days

Pantomime
Music hall
Burlesque
Musical theatre